Edmund James Cristofoli (born May 14, 1967, in Trail, British Columbia) is a retired professional ice hockey right winger. In the 1989–90 season, he played in 9 games for the Montreal Canadiens. Prior to playing pro hockey, Cristofoli played four season at the University of Denver where he set a Denver record for career games played.

Career statistics

External links

1967 births
Living people
Canadian ice hockey right wingers
Sportspeople from Trail, British Columbia
Denver Pioneers men's ice hockey players
Fredericton Canadiens players
Kansas City Blades players
Montreal Canadiens draft picks
Montreal Canadiens players
Penticton Knights players
Sherbrooke Canadiens players
University of Denver alumni
Ice hockey people from British Columbia